Dungun is a coastal district of the Malaysian state of Terengganu. Kuala Dungun is the capital of the district. Dungun is made up of eleven 'mukim', or subdistricts: Abang, Besol, Jengai, Jerangau, Kuala Dungun, Kuala Paka, Kumpal, Pasir Raja, Rasau, Sura, and Hulu Paka.

Dungun used to be an iron mining town in the 1940s. Iron ore was mined in a small town inland called Bukit Besi located to the west, while Dungun served as the port where the ore was transferred onto ships.Dungun and Bukit Besi were connected by a railway line that not only served the mining industry but also served as public transportation for inland villagers, the Dungun township and its businesses.

This "golden" era ended in the late 1970s and early 1980s. When the mines were gradually closed down, the rail service stopped and the company left the area. Bukit Besi is now a Government-financed plantation estate; the rolling hills and old British architecture are now long gone, replaced by Felda Estate housing and palm oil trees.Dungun is now just another town on the coast of Terengganu, sorely bereft of cultural activities, with no cinemas, and only comes alive every Thursday when the weekly night market opens up for business. It is well known as the biggest night market in Terengganu and features second-hand clothing (imported from Japan and the United States) and also food of all sorts. People from the outskirts flow into town for the cheap goods. The night market is situated right in the middle of town, taking over a portion of the old railway line.

Nowadays, it is not a busy small town anymore. There are still pockets of fishing and farming families and some people involved in small businesses, while a large part of the population are involved with the petroleum industry concentrated in another township to the south, Kerteh.

Administrative divisions

Dungun District is divided into 11 mukims, which are:
 Abang
 Besol
 Jengai
 Jerangau
 Kuala Dungun (Capital)
 Kuala Paka
 Kumpal
 Pasir Raja
 Rasau
 Sura
 Hulu Paka

Demographics

Federal Parliament and State Assembly Seats 

List of Dungun district representatives in the Federal Parliament (Dewan Rakyat)

List of Dungun district representatives in the State Legislative Assembly of Terengganu

See also

 Districts of Malaysia

References